Das Reich (German: The Reich) was a weekly newspaper founded by Joseph Goebbels, the propaganda minister of Nazi Germany, in May 1940. It was published by Deutscher Verlag.

History
Das Reich was mainly the creation of Rudolf Sparing, Rolf Rienhardt and Max Amann.

Its circulation grew from 500,000 in October 1940 to over 1,400,000 by 1944.

Aside from a weekly editorial, Goebbels was not involved in the publication.  Most, but not all, of his articles after 1940 appeared in it. In the 1930s his articles had appeared in Der Völkische Beobachter but then he wished to target a more sophisticated and intellectual readership. From May 1940 he wrote 218 editorials.

When Allied forces landed in Italy, and Mussolini was briefly deposed, Goebbels decided not to write an editorial.

Contents
The paper contained news reports, essays on various subjects, book reviews, and an editorial written by Goebbels. Some of the content was written by foreign authors. With the exception of Goebbels’ editorial, Das Reich did not share the tone of other Nazi publications.

Among other topics, it covered the uncertain casualty lists from Stalingrad, distinguished between German and Allied invasions to suggest the latter would be unsuccessful, discussed the bombing raids and the V-1, deplored American culture, portrays American morale as poor (though not suggesting they would give up because of it), and finally declared that Berlin would fight to the end.

Goebbels's editorials covered a wide range of topics.  His first bragged of the accomplishments of Nazi Germany, which was then conquering France.  He spoke with continuing confidence as France fell, of the opportunities the "plutocracies" had missed for peace.  Later he issued vitriolic anti-Semitic articles, argued against listening to enemy propaganda. encouraged them for total war declared England bound to lose the war, attacked the still neutral United States, discussed the significance of its entry into the war, talked about prospects for a new year, presented German radio as a good companion (when, in fact, he hoped to lure them from enemy propaganda broadcasts), professed to be delighted that Churchill was in command in Britain, discussed cuts in food rations and severe treatment for black market dealings, urged that complaints not get in the way of the war effort, accused Douglas MacArthur of cowardice (ineffectually, as the Germans knew he had been ordered to leave), talked of the Allied bombing, describes the sinking of Allied ships by German U-Boats, explained Soviet resistance in Sevastopol as product of a stubborn but bestial Russian soul, decried the United States as having no culture, urged that Germans not allow their sense of justice be exploited by their enemies, and claimed that the Allies were as weary as the Axis.

His final article in April 1945 called for last-ditch resistance.

See also
Other newspapers of Nazi Germany:
Der Angriff ("The Attack"), Josef Goebbels' Berlin-based newspaper
Berliner Arbeiterzeitung ("Berlin Workers Newspaper"), Gregor and Otto Strasser's newspaper, representing the Strasserite wing of the Nazi Party
Illustrierter Beobachter ("Illustrated Observer"), illustrated companion to the Völkischer Beobachter
Panzerbär ("The Panzer Bear"), a tabloid Nazi newspaper intended for the troops defending Berlin from the Red Army
Das Schwarze Korps ("The Black Corps"), the official newspaper of Heinrich Himmler's Schutzstaffel (SS)
Volkischer Beobachter, the official Nazi newspaper
Der Stürmer ("The Stormer"), Julius Streicher's Nuremberg-based virulently antisemitic and frequently semi-pornographic newspaper

References
Notes

Bibliography
Randall Bytwerk. 
Hale, Oron J., The Captive Press in the Third Reich (Princeton, 1964)
Robert Michael and Karin Doerr. 
Welch, David, The Third Reich: Politics and Propaganda (London, 1993)

External links
 Cartoons from Das Reich: 1940-1941
 Cartoons from Das Reich: 1944-1945

1940 establishments in Germany
1944 disestablishments in Germany
Reich, Das
Reich, Das
Reich, Das
Defunct newspapers published in Germany
Defunct weekly newspapers